The PC-50x Family (also known as SD-050, SD-070, SD-090, 9015) is a series of home video game consoles belonging to the first generation prevalent in Europe between 1977 and the early 1980s, all produced in Asia. The designation PC-50x of the series derives from the name of the cartridges (PC-501, PC-502 ...).

The consoles do not have a central processor; all the games are implemented thanks to the individual chips in the cartridges, all based on the chip family AY-3-8xxx of General Instrument. The family also includes the so-called "9015" series in which it changes the name (9015-A, 9015-B ...) and changes the shape of the cartridges but uses the same AY-3-8xxx chips.

Common features
Some consoles produced colored screens while others were black and white. Those in color were often marked with the initial letter S of SECAM, the French standard of the color coding.

Features common to all the consoles in the family are the 10 keys for choosing the game, a start/reset button, 4/5 switches for game settings and two joystick with one button on each.

For many models, in the name there are the SD letters, which stand for Soundic (Hong Kong), the real manufacturer of the console.

Consoles list
The consoles were produced in China, imported and rebranded by several companies and sold under different names.
Below is a non-exhaustive list of them.

Games

References

External links

"PC 50x at 20th Century Video Games".

First-generation video game consoles
Home video game consoles
Products introduced in 1975
Pong variations
1970s toys
1975 in video gaming